Loretta Jean Thompson-Glickman (May 23, 1945 – March 18, 2001) was an American politician. She became the first African-American mayor of Pasadena, California in 1982, which also made her the first Black woman to be mayor of an American city of over 100,000 residents.

Early life and education 
Thompson-Glickman grew up in Pasadena, and attended courses at Pasadena City College from 1963 to 1968, but did not complete any degree program.

Career 
Thompson was a jazz singer and toured with the New Christy Minstrels and London Fog, before retiring from the entertainment industry in 1975 to start a family.  She also taught high school English in Pasadena Public Schools from 1970 to 1972, but had to resign when her temporary teaching credential expired.  

In 1977, Thompson-Glickman became the first black woman elected as a Pasadena city director, a few days before she gave birth to her younger son. Four years later, she became the city's first black vice mayor, before becoming mayor in 1982. "There was the possibility that a minority might not get to be mayor here for many years to come," she recalled of the moment. "And it was my turn."  (The office of Mayor in Pasadena was not an elected or paid position, but chosen by the elected Board of City Directors, from among the Board's own members.) She was also the first Black woman to be mayor of an American city of over 100,000 residents.

Beyond politics, Thompson-Glickman was active in church work, as choir director at Pasadena’s Grace United Methodist Church and First United Methodist Church of Pacoima, and later minister of music at New Jerusalem Baptist Church in Lubbock, Texas. She also worked as an investment and financial aid counselor. As president of the Pasadena Human Relations Committee, she was the first Black woman member of the Pasadena Tournament of Roses Association.

Personal life and legacy 
Thompson married educator and union leader Saul Z. Glickman in 1972; they had two sons, and divorced in1982. She died in 2001, at the age of 55, in Lubbock, Texas. The Loretta Glickman Endowment Fund for African-American Youth was established in her memory, by the Pasadena Community Foundation. Another scholarship fund in her memory was established at the Lubbock campus of Wayland Baptist University, where she worked in her last years. An oil portrait of Thompson-Glickman, painted in 1987 by Charles Haywood, is displayed in the Pasadena City Hall.

References

External links 

 "Loretta Glickman with Automobile" (1983), photograph in the Pasadena Museum of History, via Calisphere
 Ed Norgord, "Mayor Jo Heckman with Loretta Glickman" (1981), photograph in the Pasadena Museum of History, via Calisphere
 Lou Mack, "Mayor Loretta Thompson-Glickman with sons Jacob and Samuel in Pasadena" (1982), photograph in the Los Angeles Times Photographic Archives at UCLA, via Calisphere
 Keith Thomas, "London Fog", a 2003 webpage about the band that Glickman sang with in the 1970s, with mp3s

People from the San Gabriel Valley
Mayors of Pasadena, California
1945 births
2001 deaths
People from Lubbock, Texas
California Democrats
Women mayors of places in California
California city council members
Women city councillors in California
20th-century American politicians
20th-century American women politicians
The New Christy Minstrels members
American jazz singers
20th-century American women singers
20th-century American singers
African-American city council members in California
African-American mayors in California
African-American women musicians
Jazz musicians from California
20th-century African-American women
20th-century African-American politicians
African-American women mayors